Oraldo Britos was the minister of labour during the presidency Adolfo Rodríguez Saá in Argentina.

References

Ministers of labor of Argentina